Gidget is a 1959 American CinemaScope comedy film. The picture stars Sandra Dee, Cliff Robertson, James Darren, Arthur O'Connell, and the Four Preps. in a story about a teenager's initiation into the California surf culture and her romance with a young surfer.

The film—directed by Paul Wendkos—was the first of many screen appearances by the character Gidget, created by Hollywood writer Frederick Kohner (based on his daughter Kathy). The screenplay was written by Gillian Houghton, who was then head writer of the soap opera The Secret Storm, using the pen name Gabrielle Upton. This would be Upton's sole contribution to the Gidget canon. The story was based on Kohner's 1957 novel Gidget, the Little Girl with Big Ideas.

The film, which received one award nomination, not only inspired various sequel films, a television series, and television films, but is also considered the beginning of the entire "beach party film" genre. Gidget is credited by numerous sources (Stoked! A History of Surf Culture by Drew Kampion; The Encyclopedia of Surfing by Matt Warshaw; and Riding Giants, a documentary film by Stacy Peralta—to name just three) as the single biggest factor in the mainstreaming of surfing culture in the United States.

Plot
Francine Lawrence (Sandra Dee) is about to turn 17 and is on her summer break between her junior and senior years of high school. She resists the pressure to go "man-hunting" with her girlfriends and laments the days when the girls had fun together without boys. Francine also rejects her parents wishing to fix her up on a date with the son of a friend of the family, Jeffrey Matthews (James Darren).

On a jaunt to the beach with her well developed girlfriends, flat-chested tomboy Francine meets surfer Moondoggie. She quickly becomes infatuated with him, but he shows no romantic interest; at any rate, Francine is more attracted to surfing than man-hunting.

At home, Francine importunes her parents for $25 for a used surfboard. Russ (Arthur O'Connell) and Dorothy Lawrence (Mary LaRoche) grant their daughter's request as an early birthday present and the excited youngster returns to the beach to surf. The gang dubs their female associate "Gidget", a combination of "girl" and "midget".

Gidget associates with an all-male surfer gang led by the worldly beach bum, The Big Kahuna (Cliff Robertson). Kahuna is a Korean War Air Force veteran twice the age of Gidget who is fed up with all the rules he had to live by when he flew combat missions, and dropped out of normal society. He travels the hemisphere surfing with his pet bird. Moondoggie admires Kahuna and wants to emulate him by joining Kahuna in working his way on a freighter to go surfing in Peru at summer's end, instead of going to university as his self-made father plans. Kahuna and Gidget enjoy each other's company, with Gidget questioning how he can survive an aimless and lonely existence without a job. She questions whether if Kahuna knew then what he knew now would he still make the same lifestyle choice after leaving the Air Force. Kahuna later reflects on Gidget's words after the death of his only friend, the pet bird.

Hoping to make Moondoggie jealous, Gidget hires one of the other surfers in the gang to be her date to a luau party on the beach. Her plan backfires when the surfer she hired pawns the job off on none other than Moondoggie, unaware that he was the one Gidget wanted to make jealous. Gidget lies and tells Moondoggie that it is Kahuna that she wants to make jealous, and they have a romantic evening at the luau. Eventually, Moondoggie says something that upsets Gidget and, as she flees the luau, she runs into Kahuna and agrees to take him to a nearby beach house. Alone with Kahuna, Gidget tries to make Kahuna take her virginity. Amused, Kahuna attempts to call Gidget's bluff by pretending to take her up on her offer, but finds himself falling under her spell. Realizing what he was about to do and angry at the situation he's been put in, Kahuna throws her out of the beach house just as Moondoggie arrives. Gidget is mortified and escapes out of the back of the beach house as Moondoggie confronts Kahuna. The cops are called to break up the fight between Kahuna and Moondoggie and, after leaving the beach house, they find Gidget stranded with a flat tire and without her driver's license. They take her in to the police station. Gidget's father, having heard about the incident, decides to take over control of her social life, and orders her not to see the surfer gang again. Gidget feels devastated at her failure, at which point her mother points out the needlepoint sampler from her grandmother, on her own bedroom wall. She rereads it: "To Be A Real Woman / Is To Bring Out The / Best In A Man".

In the end, her father arranges a date for Gidget with Jeffrey Matthews that she grudgingly accepts. To her surprise, Matthews turns out to be Moondoggie. The two return to the beach to find Kahuna tearing down his beach shack and find out that he has taken a job as an airline pilot. Moondoggie and Gidget realize how they feel about each other and, as an act of romantic devotion, Moondoggie asks Gidget to wear his class pin. Kahuna cheerfully warns Moondoggie that Gidget is quite a woman.

Cast 

Cast notes:
The studio wanted Elvis Presley to play the role of Moondoggie, but he was in the United States Army at the time.
Malibu surfers Miki Dora and Mickey Munoz appear in the surfing scenes.

Production

The film was shot in just 26 days during June–July 1958 at Leo Carrillo State Park and Columbia Pictures Studios. Sandra Dee originally was going to film the sequel Gidget Goes Hawaiian but didn't. Rose Marie Reid designed all of the women's swimsuits in the film.

Reception
Howard Thompson wrote in the New York Times of April 23, 1959, "[The film] is enough to make anybody leave one of the neighborhood theatres, where it opened yesterday, and light out for Long Island Sound. Pictorially, this mild little Columbia frolic, about a teen-age girl with boy trouble, seems an ideal way to usher in the beach season." He praised performers Dee, Robertson, and La Roche.

Craig Butler in Allmovie notes, "Although the very title prompts snorts of derision from many, Gidget is actually not a bad little teenaged flick from the '50s. Great art it definitely isn't, but as frivolous, lighthearted entertainment, it more than fits the bill. Those who know it only by reputation will probably be surprised to find that it does attempt to deal with the problems of life as seen by a teenager—and that, while some of those attempts are silly, many of them come off quite well. It also paints a very convincing picture of the beach-bum lifestyle, much more so than the Frankie Avalon–Annette Funicello beach party movies."

Home media
On November 10, 2017, Twilight Time Movies released Gidget (1959) on high-definition Blu-ray as a limited edition (3000 copies) release.

Awards and nominations
The film received a 1960 Golden Laurel Award nomination for Top Female Comedy Performance for actress Sandra Dee.

See also
 List of American films of 1959

References

External links
 
 
 
 
 
 

1959 films
1950s English-language films
1959 romantic comedy films
1950s teen films
American teen romance films
Columbia Pictures films
Films directed by Paul Wendkos
Films based on American novels
Films set in California
Gidget films
American surfing films
1950s American films